The S1 is a railway service of the Bern S-Bahn that provides half-hourly service between  and  via . BLS AG, a private company primarily owned by the federal government and the canton of Bern, operates the service. The S1 is the oldest of the Bern S-Bahn routes, tracing its roots back to 1987.

Operations 
, most services are operated by BLS RABe 515 multiple units.

History 

Swiss Federal Railways (SBB) had run trains on a half-hourly schedule over the Lausanne–Bern and Bern–Thun railway lines since 1987. Trains ran between Thun and Flamatt every 30 minutes, continuing to either  or Fribourg. The service gained the designation "S1" on 28 May 1995 when the S2 began operating.

The S1 has continued relatively unchanged since then. The Bern-Lötschberg-Simplon-Bahn (BLS) assumed operation from the SBB in December 2004, and the S11 began running as a rush-hour supplement between Bern and Fribourg. Beginning in December 2008, the S11 was eliminated, and the S1 ceased serving Laupen BE: all trains continued to Fribourg on a half-hourly schedule. The re-routed S2 took over service between Flamatt and Laupen BE.

References

External links 
 2023 timetable

Bern S-Bahn lines
Transport in the canton of Bern
Transport in the canton of Fribourg